Metasilicates are silicates containing ions of empirical formula . Common stoichiometries include MSiO3 and MIISiO3.  Metasilicates can be cyclic, usually the hexamer  or chains  .

Common compounds containing metasilicate anion are:

 Metasilicic acid (hydrogen metasilicate)
 Sodium metasilicate
 Calcium metasilicate

References